James Nollner "Stein" Stone Sr. (April 18, 1882 – August 25, 1926) was an American football and basketball player and coach.  "Stein" is the German for stone.

Vanderbilt University
At Vanderbilt he was a member of the Delta Tau Delta fraternity.

Football
He was a four time All-Southern center for Dan McGugin's Vanderbilt football teams, selected for the position on all-time Vanderbilt teams in 1912 and 1934. He was also selected for an Associated Press Southeast Area All-Time football team 1869–1919 era. On another all-time team of Southerners, one finds "For center we shove in Stein Stone of Vanderbilt, who is about as good as man as the South ever saw. Vanderbilt will have about eight of these eleven men."   He was some 6 foot 3 and 180 pounds.

1907
In the 1907 game against Michigan, "In the duel of centers, Stone of Vanderbilt, had the best of "Germany" Schulz. Michigan's massive center. Stone's play was spectacular all the way." His catch on a double-pass play then thrown near the end zone by Bob Blake to set up the touchdown run in by Honus Craig that beat Sewanee, for the SIAA championship in 1907, was cited by Grantland Rice as the greatest thrill he ever witnessed in his years of watching sports.

Basketball
On top of this, Stein was supposedly "the finest basketball player in Dixie."

Coaching career
He served as the head coach of the Clemson college football program in 1908. The Tigers won just a single game, though captain Stick Coles was selected second-team All-Southern. Stein later worked as an engineer in Bristol, Tennessee, where he and his wife, the former Camille Evans, whom he married in 1911, lived.

He died in 1926 in Nashville of lung and oral cancer. He is buried at Mount Olivet Cemetery in Nashville.

Head coaching record

Football

Basketball

References

1882 births
1926 deaths
American football centers
American football linebackers
American men's basketball players
Basketball coaches from Tennessee
Clemson Tigers football coaches
Vanderbilt Commodores football players
Vanderbilt Commodores men's basketball coaches
Vanderbilt Commodores men's basketball players
All-Southern college football players
Players of American football from Nashville, Tennessee
Basketball players from Nashville, Tennessee